Călinești-Oaș is a commune in Satu Mare County, north-western Romania, with a population of 4,686. Part of the region of Maramureș, it is composed of four villages: Călinești-Oaș, Coca (Kakáktelep), Lechința (Avaslekence), and Pășunea Mare (Nagylegelő).

Geography
Călinești-Oaș is situated in the Oaș Depression, near the Jelejnic Hill,  North - East of the county seat Satu Mare on the Talna and Tur rivers. The commune borders Gherța Mică commune to the north, Prilog Vii village and Livada city to the south, Boinești village to the east and Turulung commune to the west, which represents the boundary between the historical Oaș Country and Ugocea.

Călineşti-Oaş has a continental climate, characterised by hot dry summers and cold winters. As the commune is located in the far north of the country in a mountainous region, the average annual temperature is slightly lower than in Satu Mare.

Flora and fauna
The flora associated with Călinești-Oaș is characteristic of the low-mountain and hill area with coniferous trees, but other kinds of trees including several oak species and beech are also present.

Fauna is represented by species of rodents (hamster and european ground squirrel), reptiles, carnivorous mammals (bear, gray wolf and fox) and other large mammals like wild boar and deer. Avifauna include species of ducks, geese, egrets and storks during migrations as well as occasional wanderings.

History
The hills surrounding Călinești-Oaș used to be inhabited by communities of hunter-gatherers since the stone Age. Paleolithic discoveries were made on the Hurca Hill, Saint Mary Hill, Lichihorb and Bocoghița. Other important finds indicate that the commune was inhabited during the Neolithic Age and archaeological investigations were made between 1999 and 2001 that established the settlement as dating from the Early Neolithic Age (5500 - 5200 BC). The finds belong to the Starčevo culture representing the northern limit of the culture. On Hurca Hill a big fortified settlement was discovered dating from the 10th and the 9th centuries BC. The fortification consisted of an earthen mound and strengthened with large stone blocks. The fortification dates from the Early Iron Age and belonged to the Gáva culture.

Călinești-Oaș is first mentioned in documents in 1490 as Kalynhaza when the area was incorporated into the domain of Medieșu Aurit, property of the Móric family, a wealthy Hungarian aristocratic family from Győr. Their influence lasted until the 15th century. Other owners of the domains that included Călinești were the Báthory Family of Hungary, Rákóczi, Károlyi (owned during the 18th century) and the Vécsey (owned during the 19th century). After World War I the commune suffered from the 1918 flu pandemic, also known as the Spanish Influenza, which killed 48 people.

Demographics
At the Romanian census conducted in 2011, the population of Călinești-Oaș commune was 4,686. Of these inhabitants, 99% are Romanian, 0.6% are Roma and 0.4% belong to other groups. 85.6% are Romanian Orthodox, 6.7% Greek-Catholic, 6.4% Pentecostal and 1.3% other or undeclared.

The dam
The Călinești-Oaș Dam was built in 1972 on the river Tur near the confluence with the Valea Rea between the Hurca and Jelejnic Hills. In the same year the Călineşti-Oaş Micro - Hydropower Station was built having a low capacity Pelton turbine of only 0.8 MW.

References

Communes in Satu Mare County
Starčevo–Körös–Criș culture